The 1900 Rush Medical football team was an American football team that represented Rush Medical College in the 1900 college football season.

Schedule

References

Rush Medical
Rush Medical College football seasons
College football winless seasons
Rush Medical football